The Lewis and Clark Memorial Bridge in the US state of South Dakota is a bridge that carries Interstate 90 (I-90) across the Missouri River and Lake Francis Case between Chamberlain on the east bank and Oacoma on the west bank of the river. Construction on the bridge began in 1967 and cost $8 million. It was dedicated on July 7, 1974, and was opened to traffic in August.

A historical marker, located at the Lewis and Clark Interpretive Center in Chamberlain-Oacoma, South Dakota, overlooks the bridge.

See also
 
 List of crossings of the Missouri River

References

External links
Lewis & Clark Memorial Bridge by John A. Weeks

Bridges of the United States Numbered Highway System
Bridges over the Missouri River
Buildings and structures in Brule County, South Dakota
Buildings and structures in Lyman County, South Dakota
Road bridges in South Dakota
U.S. Route 81